César Federico Pintos Álvarez (born 17 November 1992 in Montevideo) is an Uruguayan footballer who plays as an attacking midfielder for Salto FC in Uruguay.

Club career
Pintos started his career playing with Defensor Sporting. He made his professional debut during the 2011/12 season. Then he moved to Argentinian side Belgrano for 2014 season.

References

1992 births
Living people
Uruguayan footballers
Association football midfielders
Club Atlético River Plate (Montevideo) players
Defensor Sporting players
Club Atlético Belgrano footballers